Kazimierz Chrzanowski (born 25 December 1951 in Łaziska Górne) is a Polish politician. He was elected to the Sejm on 25 September 2005, getting 11296 votes in 13 Kraków district as a candidate from the Democratic Left Alliance list.

He was also a member of the Sejm 1997-2001 and the Sejm 2001-2005.

See also
Members of Polish Sejm 2005-2007

External links
Kazimierz Chrzanowski - parliamentary page - includes declarations of interest, voting record, and transcripts of speeches.

Members of the Polish Sejm 2005–2007
Members of the Polish Sejm 1997–2001
Members of the Polish Sejm 2001–2005
Democratic Left Alliance politicians
1951 births
Living people
People from Mikołów County